Deshamanya Geoffrey Manning Bawa, FRIBA (23 July 1919 – 27 May 2003) was a Sri Lankan architect. He was among the most influential Asian architects of his generation.

Early life
Geoffrey Bawa was born in Colombo on 23 July 1919, the youngest of two sons to Major Benjamin Bawa, Sri Lankan lawyer, who was of part European parentage, and Bertha Marianne née Schrader, a Burgher of mixed Sinhalese, German and Scottish descent. His older brother, Bevis, became a landscape architect.

Education
Bawa was educated at Royal College, Colombo after which he studied English and Law, 1938, at St Catharine's College, Cambridge gaining a BA (English Literature Tripos) and went on to study law at Middle Temple, London, becoming a barrister in 1944. 

Returning to Ceylon after World War II, he worked for a Colombo law firm. After the death of his mother, he left the profession and soon left in 1946 to travel for two years, going to the Far East, across the United States, and finally to Europe and almost settling in Italy. By the time he was 28 years old, he had spent a third of his life away from Sri Lanka. During his time in Italy, he planned to buy a villa and settle down, but that did not happen, and by 1948 he had returned to Sri Lanka.

Bawa bought an abandoned rubber estate on the south-west coast of the island between Colombo and Galle at Lunuganga, planning to create an Italian garden from a tropical wilderness. However, he soon found that his ideas were compromised by his lack of technical knowledge. In 1951, he was apprenticed to H. H. Reid, the sole surviving partner of the Colombo architectural practice Edwards, Reid and Begg.

In 1952 Reid died, but Bawa still aspired to a career in architecture, so he returned to England. After spending a year at Cambridge, he enrolled as a student at the Architectural Association in London, where he earned a Diploma in Architecture by 1956 and in the following year he became an Associate of the Royal Institute of British Architects. In 1957, at the age of 38 he returned to Sri Lanka as a qualified architect to take over what was left of Reid's practice.

Career in architecture
Returning to Ceylon, he became a partner of Messrs. Edwards, Reid and Begg, Colombo in 1958. In 1959, Danish architect Ulrik Plesner joined the firm, and the two designed many buildings together.

Bawa was influenced by colonial and traditional Ceylonese architecture, and the role of water in it, but rejected both the idea of regionalism and the imposition of preconceived forms onto a site.

Plesner left the island in 1967. Bawa became an Associate of the Sri Lanka Institute of Architects in 1960. An ensuing close association with a coterie of like-minded artists and designers, including Ena de Silva, Barbara Sansoni and Laki Senanayake, produced a new awareness of indigenous materials and crafts, leading to a post-colonial renaissance of culture.

In 1979, President J. R. Jayewardene invited Bawa to design Sri Lanka's new Parliament building at Kotte. The project was completed in 1982 with the help of a firm of Japanese contractors, Mitsui.

Later life and death 
In 1982, Bawa established the Geoffrey Bawa Trust with the aim of furthering the fields of architecture, fine arts and environmental studies. In the early 1990s, Bawa suffered a series of strokes that left him ill. Bawa died on 27 May 2003 at the age of 83.

Influence
Geoffrey Bawa influenced a generation of architects in Sri Lanka after him, but his legacy was also embraced in Asia and around the world.

List of works
Geoffrey Bawa's work was mainly in Sri Lanka, but included several other countries as well: nine times in India, three times in Indonesia, twice in Mauritius and once in Fiji, and Singapore. His works include houses, hotels, schools, clubs, offices and government buildings, most notably the Sri Lankan Parliament Building. Today, the Gallery Café on Paradise Road in Colombo is located in Bawa's former office building.

1940s
 Lunuganga, Bentota (1948–1998)
1950s
 St. Thomas' Preparatory School, Colombo (1957–1964)
 Carmen Gunasekera House, Colombo (1958)
 Kanangara House, Colombo (1959)
 Club House, Ratnapura (1959)
 Deraniyagala House, Colombo (1959)
 Wimal Fernando House, Colombo (1959)
 Jayawardena house, Colombo (1959–1960)
 Ekala Industrial Estate, Ja ela (1959–1960)
 A.S.H. De Silva House, Galle (1959–1960)
 Manager's Bungalow, Maskeliya (1959–1960)
 Turin Koralage House, Elpitiya (1959–1960)
 Wijewardene House, Colombo (1959–1964)
1960s
 Osmund and Ena de Silva House, Colombo (1960–62)
 Bishop's College, Colombo (1960–1963)
 33rd Lane, Colombo (1960–1998)
 Nazareth Chapel, Good Shepherd Convent, Bandarawela (1961–1962)
 House for Dr. Bartholomeusz, Colombo (1961–1963)
 House for Chris and Carmel Raffel, Colombo (1962–1964)
 Pim and Pam Fernando House, Colombo (1963)
 St. Bridget's Montessori School, Colombo (1963–1964)
 Polontalawa Estate Bungalow, Polontalawa (1963–1965)
 Hilton Colombo, Colombo (1965)
 Madurai Boys' Town, Madurai, India (1965–1967)
 Yahapath Endera Farm School, Hanwella (1965–1971)
 Coral Gardens Hotel – additions and renovations, Hikkaduwa (1966)
 Grand Oriental Hotel (Taprobane Hotel) – additions and renovations, Colombo (1966)
 Steel Corporation Offices, Oruwala (1966–1969)
 Bentota Beach Hotel, Bentota (1967–1969)
 Pieter Keuneman House, Colombo (1967–1969)
 Serendib Hotel, Bentota (1967–1970)
 Yala Beach Hotel, Yala (1968)
 Mahahalpe Farm, Kandy (1969)
 Ceylon Pavilion 1970 World's Fair, Osaka, Japan (1969–1970)
1970s
 Pallakele Industrial Estate, Pallekele (1970–1971)
 P.C. de Saram Terrace Houses, Colombo (1970–1973)
 Science Block, Nugegoda (1971)
 Madurai Club, Madurai, India (1971–1974)  - it has been renamed as Heritage Madurai.
 Hotel Connamara Remodelling, Chennai, India (1971–1976)
 Club Mediterranee, Nilaveli (1972)
 Stanley de Saram House, Colombo (1972)
 Batujimbar Pavilions, Sanur, Indonesia (1972–1975)
 Peter White House, Pereybere, Mauritius (1973–1974)
 Heritance Ayurveda Maha Gedara formally Neptune Hotel, Beruwala (1973–1976)
 Agrarian Research and Training Institute, Colombo (1974–1976)

 Hotel at Pondicherry, Puducherry, India (1975)
 Seema Malaka, Colombo (1976–1978)
 State Mortgage Bank, Colombo (1976–1978)
 Candoline Hotel, Goa, India (1977)
 Panama Hotel, Panama (1977)
 Martenstyn House, Colombo (1977–1979)
 Meena Muttiah Hospital for the Kumarni of Chettinad, Chennai, India (1978)
 House for Lidia Gunasekera, Bentota (1978–1980)
 Institute for Integral Education, Piliyandala (1978–1981)
 Club Villa Hotel, Bentota (1979)
 Heritance Ahungalla formally Triton Hotel, Ahungalla (1979–1981)
 Sri Lankan Parliament Building, Kotte (1979–1982)
1980s
 University of Ruhuna, Matara (1980–1988)
 Galadari Hotel, Islamabad, Pakistan (1984)
 Sunethra Bandaranaike House, Horagolla (1984–1986)
 Offices for Banque Indosuez, Colombo (1985)
 Institute of Engineering Technology, Katunayake (1985)
 Fitzherbert House, Tangalle (1985–1986)
 De Soysa House, Colombo (1985–1991)
 Bashir Currimjee House, Port Louis, Mauritius (1986–1994)
 Hyatt Hotel, Sanur, Sanur, Indonesia (1989)
 Larry Gordon House, Wakaya, Fiji (1989)
 Singapore Cloud Centre, Singapore (1989)
1990s
 Banyan Tree Hotel, Tanjung Pinang, Indonesia (1991)
 Heritance Kandalama Hotel, Dambulla (1991–1994)
 Jayakody House, Colombo, Colombo (1991–1996)
 Sarabhai House, Ahmedabad, India (1992)
 Modi House, Delhi, India (1992)
 Jayakody House, Bentota, Bentota (1993)
 Poddar House, Bangalore, India (1994)
 Avani Kalutara Resort (Formerly Kani Lanka Resort & Spa), Kalutara (1994–1996)
 Lighthouse Hotel, Galle (1995–1997)
 Blue Water Hotel, Colombo (1996–1998)
 Official Residence of the President, Kotte (1997–)
 Pradeep Jayewardene House, Mirissa (1997–1998)
 Spencer House, Colombo (1998)
 Jacobsen House, Tangalle (?)
 The Last House, Tangalle (1997)
2000s
 Anantara Kalutara Resort, Kalutara (Completed 2016 to Bawa's design)
Unbuilt
 U.N. Headquarters, Malé, Malé, Maldives (1985)

Gallery

Awards and fellowships
 Pan Pacific Citation, Hawaii Chapter of the American Institute of Architects (1967)
 President, Sri Lanka Institute of Architects (1969)
 Inaugural Gold Medal at the Silver Jubilee Celebration of the Sri Lanka Institute of Architects (1982)
 Heritage Award of Recognition, for “Outstanding Architectural Design in the Tradition of Local Vernacular Architecture”, for the new Parliamentary Complex at Sri Jayawardenepura, Kotte from the Pacific Area Travel Association. (1983)
 Fellow of the Royal Institute of British Architects
 Elected Honorary Fellow of the American Institute of Architects (1983)
 Conferred title of Vidya Jothi (Light of Science) in the Inaugural Honours List of the President of Sri Lanka (1985)
 Teaching Fellowship at the Aga Khan Programme for Architecture, at MIT, Boston, USA (1986)
 Conferred title Deshamanya (Pride of the Nation) in the Honours List of the President Sri Lanka (1993)
 The Grate Master's Award 1996 incorporating South Asian Architecture Award (1996)
 The Architect of the Year Award, India (1996)
 Asian Innovations Award, Bronze Award – Architecture, Far Eastern Economic Review (1998)
 The Chairman's Award of the Aga Khan Award for Architecture in recognition of a lifetime's achievement in and contribution to the field of architecture (2001)
 Awarded Doctor of Science (Honoris Causa), University of Ruhuna (14 September 2002)

See also
 Muzharul Islam
 B.V. Doshi
 Charles Correa

References

Further reading

External links
 Official website
 Geoffrey Bawa architecture travel guide on www.checkonsite.com
 Architectural Digest: Inside the Sri Lankan Architecture of Geoffrey Bawa. The incredible work getting the world’s attention
 Disappearing Bawa 
Various articles and links about Geoffrey Bawa on www.suravi.fr

1919 births
2003 deaths
Alumni of St Catharine's College, Cambridge
Alumni of Royal College, Colombo
Deshamanya
Fellows of the Royal Institute of British Architects
People from British Ceylon
Members of the Middle Temple
Sri Lankan Moor architects
Sri Lankan Moor lawyers
Sri Lankan people of English descent
Sri Lankan people of German descent
Sri Lankan people of Scottish descent
Alumni of the Architectural Association School of Architecture
Sri Lankan LGBT people
Vidya Jyothi
20th-century Sri Lankan architects
20th-century LGBT people
LGBT architects